The men's light heavyweight (81 kg/178.2 lbs) Low-Kick division at the W.A.K.O. European Championships 2006 in Skopje was the fourth heaviest of the male Low-Kick tournaments and the largest involving twenty fighters.  Each of the matches was three rounds of two minutes each and were fought under Low-Kick kickboxing rules.

As there were too few men for a tournament fit for thirty-two, twelve of the contestants received a bye through to the 2nd round.  The gold medal was won by emerging Serb star Nenad Pagonis who won his first W.A.K.O. championships by defeating Bosnian Drazenko Ninic in the final by unanimous decision.  Rail Rajabov from Azerbaijan and Teppo Laine from Finland won bronze medals for their efforts in reaching the semi finals.

Results

Key

See also
List of WAKO Amateur European Championships
List of WAKO Amateur World Championships
List of male kickboxers

References

External links
 WAKO World Association of Kickboxing Organizations Official Site

W.A.K.O. European Championships 2006 (Skopje)